"Baby It's You" is a song by English band London Grammar, released on 19 August 2020 as the lead single from their third studio album, Californian Soil (2021).

The song peaked at number 80 on the UK Singles Chart.

Critical reception
Andrew Trendell from NME wrote, "'Baby It's You' carries the trio's familiar atmospherics and some of the more trance-driven elements akin to early single 'Metal & Dust', but also features a new, more colourful Balearic sound and vibe – with the assistance of acclaimed electronic producer George FitzGerald."

Personnel
Credits adapted from Tidal.

London Grammar – producer, associated performer
 Daniel Rothman – composer, lyricist, guitar
 Dominic Major – composer, lyricist, keyboards
 Hannah Reid – composer, lyricist, vocals
Other musicians
 George FitzGerald – producer, composer, lyricist
 Chris Gehringer – mastering engineer
 Nathan Boddy – misc. producer, mixing engineer

Charts

Release history

References

2020 singles
2020 songs
London Grammar songs
Song recordings produced by George FitzGerald (musician)
Song recordings produced by London Grammar
Songs written by George FitzGerald (musician)
Songs written by Hannah Reid
Songs written by Dan Rothman
Songs written by Dominic Major